Karen Bernstein is a Canadian retired voice actress. She is best known to many in North America as the original voice of Sailor Mercury in the Canadian dubbing of the first two seasons of Sailor Moon. She was replaced by Liza Balkan.

Bernstein is also known for voicing Hello Kitty in the mid-nineties, and for portraying Tara Belle and Jett in Beverly Hills Teens in the eighties.

Filmography

Film
 Why Shoot the Teacher? (1977) – Violet Sinclair
 Pippi Longstocking (1997) – Mrs. Settergren
 Sailor Moon R the Movie: Promise of the Rose (2000) – Sailor Mercury
 Sailor Moon S the Movie: Hearts in Ice (2000) – Sailor Mercury
 Sailor Moon Supers the Movie: Black Dream Hole (2000) – Sailor Mercury

Television
 Beverly Hills Teens (1987) – Tara Belle, Jett
 Tales from the Cryptkeeper (1993–1994) – The Weeping Woman, The Vampire, The Sleeping Beauty
 Hello Kitty and Friends (1994) – Hello Kitty
 Sailor Moon (1995, 1998) – Sailor Mercury (Seasons 1–2)
 The Magic School Bus (1996) – Additional Voices
 Pippi Longstockings (1997) – Mrs. Settergren
 Birdz (1998) – Olivia Owl
 Noddy (1999) – Tessie Bear
 Something for Nothing (1999) – Mother
 Little People: Big Discoveries (2002) – Maggie
 Little People: Discovering the ABC's (2005)

Video Games
 Laura's Happy Adventures (1995) – Miriam

References

External links
 

Canadian film actresses
Canadian television actresses
Canadian video game actresses
Canadian voice actresses
Living people
20th-century Canadian actresses
21st-century Canadian actresses
Year of birth missing (living people)